The Maze is the fifth studio album by guitarist Vinnie Moore, released on March 23, 1999 through Shrapnel Records.

Track listing

Personnel
Vinnie Moore – guitar, mixing, production
Tony MacAlpine – keyboard
Shane Gaalaas – drums
Dave LaRue – bass
Mark Rennick – engineering
Noah Landis – engineering
James Murphy – engineering
Gustavo Venegas – engineering
Paul Orofino – mixing
Christopher Ash – mastering
Mike Varney – executive production

References

Notes

External links
In Review: Vinnie Moore "The Maze" at Guitar Nine

Vinnie Moore albums
1999 albums
Shrapnel Records albums
Albums produced by Mike Varney
Albums recorded in a home studio